Éire Óg GAA was a Gaelic Athletic Association club located in Kilkenny, Ireland. The club was almost solely concerned with the game of hurling.

History

The Éire Óg club was founded in Kilkenny CBS in 1931. Initially adopting blue and white colours and called Young Irelands, the club quickly became Éire Óg and changed to green and white. The club first came to hurling prominence by winning five Kilkenny MAHC titles in six seasons between 1932 and 1937. A number of these schoolboy players from this grade went on to form the nucleus of the club's adult team over the following decade. After winning the Kilkenny JHC title in 1936, Éire Óg secured promotion to the top tier of Kilkenny hurling by claiming the Kilkenny IHC title the following year. The club went on to appear in seven county finals between 1938 and 1950, with victories coming on four occasions. Defeat in the 1950 county final replay brought about the break-up of the successful team of the previous decade. New players emerged, however, a ready supply of minor players dried up as city rivals James Stephens and Dicksboro came to prominence. The club's final game took place against Rower-Inistioge in 1968 and the club was later disbanded.

Honours

Kilkenny Senior Hurling Championship: 1939, 1944, 1945, 1947
Kilkenny Intermediate Hurling Championship: 1937
Kilkenny Junior Football Championship: 1937
Kilkenny Junior Hurling Championship: 1936
North Kilkenny Junior Football Championship: 1937
North Kilkenny Junior Hurling Championship: 1936
Kilkenny Minor A Hurling Championship: 1932, 1934, 1935, 1936, 1937
North Kilkenny Minor A Hurling Championship: 1932, 1934, 1935, 1936, 1937, 1941

Notable players

 Ramie Dowling
 Jack Egan
 Jack Gargan
 Paddy Grace
 Pat Hayden
 Paddy Johnston
 Jim Langton
 Fan Larkin
 Paddy Larkin
 Pádraig Lennon
 Jack Mulcahy
 Paddy O'Brien
 Seánie O'Brien
 Tommy O'Connell
 Nick O'Donnell
 Jimmy Phelan
 Liam Reidy

References

External links
Kilkenny GAA Bible

Gaelic games clubs in County Kilkenny
Hurling clubs in County Kilkenny